Yarebitsa is a village in Kardzhali Municipality, Kardzhali Province, southern Bulgaria.

Yarebitsa Cove in Smith Island, Antarctica is named after the village.

References

Villages in Kardzhali Province